The Arrogant-class ships of the line were a class of twelve 74-gun third rate ships designed by Sir Thomas Slade for the Royal Navy.

Design
The Arrogant-class ships were designed as a development of Slade's previous , sharing the same basic dimensions. During this period, the original armament was the same across all the ships of the common class, of which the Arrogant-class ships were members. Two ships were ordered on 13 December 1758 to this design (at the same time as the fourth and fifth units of the Bellona class), and a further ten ships were built to a slightly modified version of the Arrogant design from 1773 onwards.

Ships

References

Lavery, Brian (2003) The Ship of the Line – Volume 1: The development of the battlefleet 1650–1850. Conway Maritime Press. .
Winfield, Rif (2007) British Warships in the Age of Sail 1714–1792; Design, Construction, Careers and Fates. Seaforth Publishing. .

External links

 
Ship of the line classes
Ship classes of the Royal Navy